= Grosz Jakosa =

1989 board game

Grosz Jakosa is a board game published in 1989 by Uzhorodnhya Rikrosi.

== Contents ==
Grosz Jakosa is a game in which greyhound racing is depicted in a series of six races at a race meeting.

== Reception ==
Stan Bowles reviewed Grosz Jakosa for Games International magazine, and gave it a rating of 9 out of 10, and stated that "I have seldom seen such a clever system for simulating dog racing and only the ersatz production quality loses Grosz Jakosa that elusive hall of fame 'Ten'..."
